Altogether, 12 presidents of South Korea have traveled to 71 countries or territories while in office.

Moon Jae-in

Moon Jae-in has made 32 presidential trips to 40 states internationally since his inauguration on 10 May 2017.

Yoon Suk-yeol

Yoon Suk-yeol has made 4 presidential trips to 8 states internationally since his inauguration on 10 May 2022.

Table of destinations

References

Presidencies of South Korea
Foreign relations of South Korea
South Korea
South Korea